Cloud Creek is an unincorporated community and census-designated place (CDP) in Delaware County, Oklahoma, United States. The population was 121 at the 2010 census, a 40.7 percent increase over the figure of 86 recorded in 2000 census.

Geography
Cloud Creek is located in southern Delaware County at  (36.274560, -94.770668). Its eastern border is formed by U.S. Route 59, which leads north  to Jay, the county seat, and south  to the town of Kansas.

Demographics

As of the census of 2000, there were 86 people, 30 households, and 26 families residing in the community. The population density was 11.9 people per square mile (4.6/km2). There were 31 housing units at an average density of 4.3/sq mi (1.7/km2). The racial makeup of the community was 52.33% White, 43.02% Native American, 1.16% from other races, and 3.49% from two or more races. Hispanic or Latino of any race were 1.16% of the population.

There were 30 households, out of which 43.3% had children under the age of 18 living with them, 63.3% were married couples living together, 20.0% had a female householder with no husband present, and 13.3% were non-families. 13.3% of all households were made up of individuals, and 6.7% had someone living alone who was 65 years of age or older. The average household size was 2.87 and the average family size was 3.15.

The population age distribution was spread out, with 33.7% under the age of 18, 4.7% from 18 to 24, 31.4% from 25 to 44, 24.4% from 45 to 64, and 5.8% who were 65 years of age or older. The median age was 33 years. For every 100 females, there were 83.0 males. For every 100 females age 18 and over, there were 96.6 males.

The median income for a household in the CDP was $23,333, and the median income for a family was $18,125. Males had a median income of $100,000 versus $0 for females. The per capita income for the community was $20,127. There were 63.6% of families and 70.5% of the population living below the poverty line, including 100.0% of under eighteens and none of those over 64.

References

Census-designated places in Delaware County, Oklahoma
Census-designated places in Oklahoma